Cedar Island may refer to:

Canada
Cedar Island (Kingston), in Kingston, Ontario
Cedar Island (Kingsville), in Kingsville, Ontario
Cedar Island (Niagara River), in Niagara Falls, Ontario

United States
 Cedar Island (Alaska)
 Cedar Island (Connecticut) in Clinton, Connecticut
 Cedar Island (Maryland)
 Cedar Island (Chincoteague Bay), Worcester County, Maryland
 Cedar Island (Bristol County, Massachusetts), in Bristol County, Massachusetts
 Cedar Island (Dukes County, Massachusetts)
 Cedar Island (Plymouth County, Massachusetts), in Plymouth County, Massachusetts
 Cedar Island (Cass Lake), in Cass Lake
 Cedar Island (New York)
 Cedar Island, North Carolina
 Cedar Island (Oregon)
 Cedar Island, South Carolina
 Cedar Island (Virginia)